Dinocoryna is a genus of rove beetles in the family Staphylinidae. There are at least 6 described species in Dinocoryna.

Species
 Dinocoryna akrei Seevers, 1965
 Dinocoryna arizonensis Seevers, 1959
 Dinocoryna bisinuata Casey, 1893
 Dinocoryna carolinensis Seevers, 1959
 Dinocoryna schmitti (Wasmann, 1897)
 Dinocoryna tibialis Seevers, 1959

References

 Frank, J. H. (1986). "A preliminary checklist of the Staphylinidae (Coleoptera) of Florida". Florida Entomologist, vol. 69, no. 2, 363–382.

Further reading

 Arnett, R.H. Jr., M. C. Thomas, P. E. Skelley and J. H. Frank. (eds.). (2002). American Beetles, Volume II: Polyphaga: Scarabaeoidea through Curculionoidea. CRC Press LLC, Boca Raton, FL.
 
 Richard E. White. (1983). Peterson Field Guides: Beetles. Houghton Mifflin Company.

Aleocharinae